Menelaos Mikhailidis (born 1947) is a Greek former sports shooter. He competed in the skeet event at the 1968 Summer Olympics.

References

1947 births
Living people
Greek male sport shooters
Olympic shooters of Greece
Shooters at the 1968 Summer Olympics
Place of birth missing (living people)
20th-century Greek people